Edgar Iván Pacheco Rodríguez (born 22 January 1990) is a Mexican professional footballer who last played for club Antigua GFC, as a midfielder.

Club career

Atlas
Pacheco made his club debut on 20 January 2008 in a game against Club Toluca. After his debut, he was used sparingly until the return of coach Ricardo La Volpe to Atlas. Thereafter, he got more playing time and became a favorite of La Volpe's. He is known for his speed, reflexes, shooting ability, and sacrifice on both the offensive and defensive sides. He is also known for his ability to play through the left, middle, and right sides of the field ranging from defensive, recovery, creative and offensive positions. On 31 January 2010 he played as a goalkeeper against Santos Laguna after Atlas goalkeeper Mariano Barbosa was sent off for a foul. He allowed one goal, but made a crucial save in the game. The final score was a 2–1 victory for Atlas. Pacheco would go on to play with the "Rojinegros" for another 3 years, making 94 appearances and scoring 11 goals. His last season with the club would be the 2011 Clausura.

Tigres UANL
In June 2011 Pacheco was being linked to various clubs in Europe, most notably with Portuguese club Benfica. It was reported that MLS club Houston Dynamo wanted to sign Pacheco, but the deal fell through at the last minute, with the player stating that he did not want to play in the MLS. Mexican giants Club América and Chivas Guadalajara were also rumored as possible destinations. On 2 June 2011 he signed a $4 million contract with Tigres UANL.

Pacheco played his first match with UANL on 30 July, in a 0–0 draw against Querétaro, coming in a substitute in the 76th minute.

FC Juárez
Pacheco made his official debut with FC Juárez on 25 July 2015. At the 57' minute Pacheco score via penalty the first-ever goal of the franchise against Lobos BUAP. Being the Captain of the border set arriving until the end and raising the title of champion that same season 2015.

Abroad
Pacheco joined K League Challenge side Gangwon FC on 28 January 2016. On 25 May, he made his first team debut in a 1–0 victory against Goyang Zaicro. On 8 January 2017, he switched to Bahraini club Al-Najma.

On 8 July 2017, Pacheco moved to Cypriot First Division side Ermis Aradippou on a free transfer.

On 8 August 2018, Pacheco signed contract with Azerbaijan Premier League side Sabail FK. On 7 December 2018, after 8 appearances for Sabail, Pacheco left the club by mutual consent.

International career
Pacheco was called up by then-national team coach Javier Aguirre for a friendly match against Colombia. He made his debut on 30 September 2009.

He would be called up again by new coach José Manuel de la Torre for a friendly match against Bosnia and Herzegovina on 9 February 2011, where he scored his first international goal in the 2–0 victory.

2011 Copa América
He would be left out of both the 2011 CONCACAF Gold Cup squad and the 2011 Copa América squad. He was later re-called to the team to fill the space left by eight players who were suspended from the squad due to a prostitution scandal in Quito, Ecuador. He would appear in all three group matches, where Mexico would finish fourth in their group, losing all three matches. It would be the team's worst finish in a Copa América tournament.

International goals

|-
| 1. || 9 February 2011 || Georgia Dome, Atlanta, United States ||  || 2–0 || 2–0 || Friendly ||
|}

Honours
Tigres UANL
Mexican Primera División: Apertura 2011
Copa MX: Clausura 2014

References

External links

1990 births
Living people
Footballers from Jalisco
Mexican expatriate footballers
Mexico international footballers
Atlas F.C. footballers
Tigres UANL footballers
Club León footballers
Gangwon FC players
Al-Najma SC (Bahrain) players
Sabail FK players
Ermis Aradippou FC players
Doxa Katokopias FC players
Antigua GFC players
Liga MX players
K League 2 players
Bahraini Premier League players
Cypriot First Division players
Azerbaijan Premier League players
2011 Copa América players
Mexico youth international footballers
Association football midfielders
Mexican expatriate sportspeople in South Korea
Mexican expatriate sportspeople in Bahrain
Mexican expatriate sportspeople in Cyprus
Mexican expatriate sportspeople in Azerbaijan
Mexican expatriate sportspeople in Guatemala
Expatriate footballers in South Korea
Expatriate footballers in Bahrain
Expatriate footballers in Cyprus
Expatriate footballers in Azerbaijan
Expatriate footballers in Guatemala
Mexican footballers